Cambyses may refer to:

 Cambyses I, King of Anshan 600 to 559 BCE
 Cambyses II, King of Persia 530 to 522 BCE
 Cambyses, ancient name of the Iori river in the South Caucasus
 Cambyses, a tragedy (published 1569) by Thomas Preston (writer)
 Qambeez (Cambyses), a tragedy in Arabic by Ahmed Shawqi
 Kambyses, protagonist in Felix Salten’s novel The Hound of Florence

See also
 Cambysene, a historic region